Temporary Paradise is a 1981 Hungarian drama film directed by András Kovács. It was entered into the 12th Moscow International Film Festival where it won the Silver Prize.

Cast
 André Dussollier as Jacques
 Edit Frajt as Vajda Klári
 László Szabó as László / Gérard
 Christian Van Cau as A francia attasé
 Ferenc Bács as Egy magyar ezredes
 Csongor Ferenczy as Egy magyar százados
 Ágnes Bánfalvy as 	Márta (as Bánfalvi Ági)
 Edit Soós as Virágh néni
 Béla Paudits as Egy francia hadifogoly

References

External links
 

1981 films
1981 drama films
Hungarian drama films
1980s Hungarian-language films
Films directed by András Kovács